The Croisaphuill Formation is a geologic formation in Scotland. It preserves fossils dating back to the Ordovician period.

See also 
 List of fossiliferous stratigraphic units in Scotland

References

Further reading 
 D.H. Evans. 2011. The Lower Ordovician cephalopod faunas of the Durness Group, North-West Scotland. Monograph of the Palaeontographical Society, London 165:1-131

Geologic formations of Scotland
Ordovician System of Europe
Ordovician Scotland
Ordovician northern paleotemperate deposits